The preferential alignment is a criterion of an orientation of a molecule or atom. The preferential alignment can be related to the formation of the crystal structure of an amorphous structure.

For a polymer material with liquid crystals, the liquid crystals are molecules shaped like rigid rods. Just as logs being floated down a river tend to travel parallel to the direction of the river, liquid crystals have a preferential alignment with each other. At high temperatures, this alignment is disrupted and the material is said to be in the isotropic state. At lower temperatures, the alignment will take place and the liquid crystals are said to be in the pneumatic state [Hoong.C.C].

Crystallography